Ruslan Rusidze (born 10 October 1973) is a Georgian sprinter. He competed in the men's 100 metres at the 2000 Summer Olympics.

References

1973 births
Living people
Athletes (track and field) at the 2000 Summer Olympics
Male sprinters from Georgia (country)
Olympic athletes of Georgia (country)
Place of birth missing (living people)